Plikati is a village in the municipal unit of Mastorochoria, Ioannina regional unit, Greece. It is one of the northernmost villages in Epirus. In 2011 its population was 70. The village is situated at the foot of the Grammos mountains, at 1,240 m elevation, close to the Albanian border. Plikati is 3 km north of Gorgopotamos, 8 km west of Aetomilitsa, 9 km southeast of Ersekë (Albania) and 28 km north of Konitsa. Plikati has traditionally been populated by an Arvanite population and it is the only village today in Konitsa municipality where Albanian is still spoken. An Aromanian minority is also present in the village.

Population

History

Plikati is an old village, with a church dating from the 16th century. It is one of the villages of the Epirus region in Greece which are inhabited by Arvanites (Christian Albanians). Its people are sometimes called Arvanites, although the Albanian dialect they speak is different from that of Arvanitika-speakers of southern Greece and much closer to Tosk Albanian.  Due to overpopulation, poverty and raids by Muslim Albanians from the nearby Kolonjë region (located today in Albania) in the 19th century, many of its inhabitants moved away and founded new villages in the area around Florina (Belkameni and Negovani) and Larissa (Kazaklar).

See also

List of settlements in the Ioannina regional unit

References

External links
Plikati at the GTP Travel Pages
Official website of the village
Municipality of Mastorohori

Populated places in Ioannina (regional unit)
Albanian communities in Greece